Carlos García Quesada (born 17 September 1993) is a Spanish footballer who plays as a central midfielder for CD Cabecense.

Club career
Born in Seville, Andalusia, García graduated from local Real Betis' youth system, and made his senior debut in 2011 with the amateur C-team. Shortly after, he began appearing with the reserves in Segunda División B.

On 26 May 2013, García played his official match with the Andalusians' first team, coming on as a substitute for Rubén Pérez in the dying minutes of a 4–0 La Liga home win against Real Zaragoza. He only appeared for the B-side from then onwards, and terminated his contract on 17 November 2015.

On 15 December 2015, García signed a three-and-a-half year deal with Gimnàstic de Tarragona, being initially assigned to farm team CF Pobla de Mafumet also in the third level. The following 31 August, shortly after being definitely promoted to the main squad, he was loaned to fellow league club Atlético Sanluqueño CF.

On 1 September 2017, García was loaned to division three's UD Logroñés for one year. The following 30 January, his loan was cut short and he moved to FC Jumilla of the same tier also in a temporary deal.

On 31 July 2018, García terminated his contract with Nàstic.

References

External links

Carlos García at Beticopedia 

1993 births
Living people
Spanish footballers
Footballers from Seville
Association football midfielders
La Liga players
Segunda División players
Segunda División B players
Tercera División players
Betis Deportivo Balompié footballers
Real Betis players
CF Pobla de Mafumet footballers
Gimnàstic de Tarragona footballers
Atlético Sanluqueño CF players
UD Logroñés players
FC Jumilla players
Racing de Ferrol footballers
Spain youth international footballers